Gizzada or grizzada, also referred to as pinch-me-round, and known as queijada in the Portuguese language, is a pastry in Jamaican cuisine and Portuguese cuisine. The tart is contained in a small, crisp pastry shell with a pinched crust and filled with a sweet and spiced coconut filling. Trinidad also has a similar treat referred to as the coconut tart.

See also
Grater cake – a dessert of grated coconut in a fondant of sugar in Jamaican cuisine
List of Jamaican dishes
Toto – a small coconut cake in Jamaican cuisine

References

Jamaican cuisine
Portuguese cuisine
Tarts
Foods containing coconut